Aglossa rubralis is a species of snout moth in the genus Aglossa. It was described by George Hampson in 1900 and is known from Syria and Libya.

Taxonomy
The species was formerly treated as a synonym of Aglossa pinguinalis.

References

Moths described in 1900
Pyralini
Moths of the Middle East
Moths of Africa